The 2014 Women's Asian Games Rugby sevens Tournament was held in Incheon, South Korea from September 30 to October 2, 2014.

Squads

Results
All times are Korea Standard Time (UTC+09:00)

Preliminary round

Pool A

Pool B

Classification 9th–10th

Classification 5th–8th

Semifinals

Classification 7th–8th

Classification 5th–6th

Final round

Semifinals

Bronze medal match

Gold medal match

Final standing

References
Results summary

External links
Official website

Women